Douglas Corleone is an American author of contemporary crime novels and international thrillers. His debut novel One Man's Paradise won the Minotaur Books/Mystery Writers of America First Crime Novel Award.

A New York City personal injury and national U.S immigration attorney, Corleone now divides his time between New York and Hawaii.

Kevin Corvelli Mysteries
Douglas Corleone's first three novels feature the anti-hero protagonist Kevin Corvelli, a hard-drinking Honolulu criminal defense attorney seeking redemption following a high-profile professional free-fall in New York City.

The Kevin Corvelli series includes One Man’s Paradise, Night on Fire, and Last Lawyer Standing.

Simon Fisk Thrillers
Corleone's fourth novel Good As Gone is an international thriller that introduces former U.S. Marshal Simon Fisk, a private contractor who specializes in retrieving children abducted by their estranged parents and taken overseas to avoid U.S. custody laws. Haunted by his own daughter's disappearance a decade earlier, Simon Fisk refuses to take cases involving “stranger abductions,” until a French police lieutenant presents Simon with an ultimatum: spend years in a French prison in connection with an earlier case, or help to find a young American girl named Lindsay Sorkin, who was recently abducted from her parents’ hotel room in Paris.

The Simon Fisk series also includes Payoff, Gone Cold, and Beyond Gone.

Paul Janson Series
Corleone was selected by the Estate of Robert Ludlum, creator of the Jason Bourne series, to continue Ludlum's series of thrillers featuring ex-Navy SEAL and former government covert agent Paul Janson, who first appeared in the bestselling novel The Janson Directive. Other books in the series include The Janson Command and The Janson Option, both written by Paul Garrison.

The fourth novel in the Paul Janson series, titled The Janson Equation, was released in 2015.

Bibliography
 One Man’s Paradise (Minotaur Books, 2010)
 Night on Fire (Minotaur Books, 2011)
 Last Lawyer Standing (Minotaur Books, 2012)
 Good As Gone (Minotaur Books, 2013)
 Payoff (Minotaur Books, 2014)
 Gone Cold (Minotaur Books, 2015)
 Robert Ludlum's The Janson Equation (Grand Central, 2015)
 Beyond Gone (Severn House, 2020)
 The Rough Cut (Severn House, 2021)

Awards
2009 Minotaur Books/Mystery Writers of America First Crime Novel Award  
2011 Shamus Award Finalist for Best First Novel

References

1975 births
Living people
American mystery writers
American male novelists